Kalyanpur is a small village and, It is a located in the Sonpur tehsil (Block) of Saran district of the state of Bihar, India. It is an altitude of 43 meters (141 ft). Kalyanpur village is situated at an 8 km (4 mi) away from the Sub-district headquarters of Sonpur  and the 47 km (29 mi) away from the district headquarter of Chhapra. As per 2009 stats, Kalyanpur is the gram panchayat of Kalyanpur village. Nearby the Gularia Chowk is the small market in a kalyanpur village. Sonpur is the nearest town is an approximately 8 km away from the kalyanpur. Kalyanpur village connected by Sonpur Darihara Rewaghat road to Gandak baandh road.

Geography

Kalyanpur village is located  about 8 km (4 mi) north of Sonpur city. It is the total geographical area of 100 hectares. And at an altitude of 43 meters (141 ft). This village is most of the area is agricultural land with the rice and wheat as the main crop. Due to variations in annual rainfall, local farmers cannot depend on seasonal rain for irrigation and have to instead unlined perennial wells for irrigation. And the village is nearby the Gandak river for used of agriculture and other purpose.

Demographic 
As of 2011 India census, Kalyanpur had a population of 3,608. Males constitute 52% of the population and females  48%. Kalyanpur has an average literacy rate of  70%., higher than the national average of  59.5%: male literacy is 74%, and female literacy is  62%. In Kalyanpur, 4.5% of the population is under 5 year of age. There are 597 houses in Kalyanpur village.
Nearest village is Shikarpur village, Saran district.

Transportation and connectivity
Kalyanpur has good road communications due to development efforts by the government. At the village nearest city and railway station is at Sonpur, about 8 kilometres (4 mi) from the village.

Infrastructure

The Kalyanpur village have a comprehensive electricity supply but not regular power supply that efforts of local governing bodies, solar panels have been introduced to provide power for street lighting.

See also 
Sonpur

References

External links
 Kalyanpur village in saran district, Bihar  Kalyanpur village of  saran. Retrieved 31, July 2016.  
 Sonpur information to trains "Info Trains of sonpur" Retrieved 2, May 2016.

Villages in Saran district